The Northern Lakes and Forests are an ecoregion in northern Minnesota, northern Wisconsin, and northern Michigan  in the United States. It is a Level III ecoregion in the United States Environmental Protection Agency's (EPA's) classification system, where it is designated as ecoregion number 50. The ecoregion is characterized by coniferous and northern hardwoods forests, morainal hills, large lake basins, and broad areas of sandy outwash plains, with numerous lakes and wetlands. The Northern Lakes and Forests are less well-suited to agriculture than ecoregions to the south, owing to shorter growing seasons, lower temperatures, and soils formed mainly from nutrient-poor sandy and loamy glacial drift material.

Level IV ecoregions 
Following is a list of smaller Level IV ecoregions within the Northern Lakes and Forests ecoregion, as defined by the EPA.

See also 

 List of ecoregions in the United States (EPA)

References 

Ecoregions of Michigan
Ecoregions of Minnesota
Ecoregions of Wisconsin
Ecoregions of the United States
Northern Michigan
Upper Peninsula of Michigan